Heidevolk is a folk metal band from the Netherlands. The lyrical themes of their music are inspired by nature, the history of Gelderland, and Germanic mythology. Most of their lyrics are in Dutch; however, since their album Velua, they also have one original English song, "Vinland", and several English covers.

History

Heidevolk was founded under the name Hymir in 2002. They later changed their name to Heidevolk (Dutch for 'heath-folk' or 'heather folk'), inspired by the Veluwe landscape. The band started performing live in 2003. They have since released one demo, six full-length studio albums, and one EP.

Their third album, Uit oude grond, was released to generally positive critical acclaim, with one writer calling the album "A hugely enjoyable release combining aggressive metallic riffage with tastefully entwined traditional folk instrumentation and melody".

Collaborations
Vocalists Mark Bockting and Joris Boghtdrincker have contributed vocals to the Arkona song "Na Moey Zemle" (На моей земле) (In My Land). The track also features vocalists from Månegarm (Sweden), Obtest (Lithuania), Menhir (Germany), and Skyforger (Latvia). Each sings in their native language, playing the role of warriors from that region, describing their homeland to a traveler.

Band members

Current
 Jacco de Wijs (Jacco Bühnebeest) – vocals (2015–present)
 Daniël Wansink (Daniël den Dorstighe) - vocals (2021-present)
 Koen Romeijn (Koen Vuurdichter) – guitar (2015–present)
 Mat van Baest (Mat Snaerenslijper)– guitar (2020–present)
 Rowan Middelwijk (Rowan Roodbaert) – bass guitar (2006–present)
 Kevin van den Heiligenberg (Kevin Houtsplijter) – drums (2022–present)

Former
 Joris Boghtdrincker – vocals (2002–2013)
 Jesse Vuerbaert (Ohtar) – vocals (2002–2005)
 Niels Beenkerver – guitar (2002–2005)
 Paul Braadvraat – bass guitar (2002–2006)
 Sebas van Eldik (Sebas Bloeddorst) – guitar (2002–2011)
 Joost Westdijk (Joost den Vellenknotscher) – drums (2002–2022)
 Reamon Bomenbreker – guitar (2005–2015)
 Mark Splintervuyscht – vocals (2005–2015)
 Stefanie Speervrouw – violin (2007–2008)
 Kevin Vruchtbaert – guitar (2012–2015)
 Lars Vogel (Lars Nachtbraeker) – vocals (2013–2020)
 Kevin Storm – guitar (2016–2018)

Timeline

Discography
 De strijdlust is geboren (2005)
 Wodan heerst (EP, 2007)
 Walhalla wacht (2008)
 Uit oude grond (2010)
 Batavi (2012)
 Velua (2015)
 Vuur van verzet (2018)
 Wederkeer (2023)

Music videos
 "Nehalennia" (2010)
 "Als de dood weer naar ons lacht" (2012)
 "Urth" (2015)
 "Winter woede" (2015)
 "A Wolf in My Heart" (2019)

References

External links
 

Dutch folk metal musical groups
Musical groups established in 2002
Viking metal musical groups
2002 establishments in the Netherlands
Napalm Records artists